Springer Nature or the Springer Nature Group is a German-British academic publishing company created by the May 2015 merger of Springer Science+Business Media and Holtzbrinck Publishing Group's Nature Publishing Group, Palgrave Macmillan, and Macmillan Education.

History
The company originates from a number of journals and publishing houses, notably Springer-Verlag, which was founded in 1842 by Julius Springer in Berlin (the grandfather of Bernhard Springer who founded Springer Publishing in 1950 in New York), Nature Publishing Group which has published  Nature since 1869, and Macmillan Education, which goes back to Macmillan Publishers founded in 1843.

Springer Nature was formed in 2015 by the merger of Nature Publishing Group, Palgrave Macmillan and Macmillan Education (held by Holtzbrinck Publishing Group) with Springer Science+Business Media (held by BC Partners). Plans for the merger were first announced on 15 January 2015. The transaction was concluded in May 2015 with Holtzbrinck having the majority 53% share.

IPO attempts in May 2018 and Autumn 2020 were unfruitful due to unfavorable market conditions.

In 2021, Springer Nature acquired Atlantis Press, an open access publisher founded 2006 in Paris, focusing on scientific, technical, and medical (STM) content, and publication of conference proceedings.

Current company 
After the merger, former Springer Science+Business Media CEO Derk Haank became CEO of Springer Nature. When he retired by the end of 2017, he was succeeded by Daniel Ropers, the co-founder and long-time CEO of bol.com. In September 2019, Ropers was replaced by Frank Vrancken Peeters.

The company is releasing a number of Policies & Reports, including a Modern Slavery Act statement, a Tax strategy, a gender pay gap report for Springer Nature’s UK operations, Editorial and publishing policies, Code of conduct, etc.

Brands 
The following major brands belong to the group (see also Subsidiaries):
 Nature
 Springer.com
 BioMed Central
 Scientific American
 Heinrich Vogel Verlag
SciGraph

Controversies

In 2017, the company agreed to block access to hundreds of articles on its Chinese site, cutting off access to articles on Tibet, Taiwan, and China's political elite.

The company retracted a paper in 2019, in its journal BMC Emergency Medicine due to dubious peer-review process (a herpetologist could have denied the publication of the paper).

In August 2020, Springer Nature was reported to have rejected the publication of an article at the behest of its co-publisher, Wenzhou Medical University, from a Taiwanese doctor because the word "China" was not placed after "Taiwan."

In July 2020, Springer Nature retracted a paper in the journal Society due to dubious review process and criticism regarding racism.

In November 2021, Springer Nature retracted 44 nonsense papers from the Arabian Journal of Geosciences after a lapse in the peer review process.

Subsidiaries

Further reading 
 Fact Sheet 2022 (linked PDF)
 Fact Sheet Open Access 2022 (linked PDF)
 Springer Nature Group Press Office

See also 

 Publishing
 Scientific publication

References

External links

Academic publishing companies
Multinational publishing companies
Publishing companies established in 2015
Holtzbrinck Publishing Group